Brilliant Dam is a hydroelectric dam on the Kootenay River near Castlegar, British Columbia, Canada. It was built during the Second World War, mostly by Doukhobour men exempt from military service, and its 129 MW twin turbines first came into operation in June, 1944. The Columbia Power Corporation purchased the dam from Teck Cominco in 1996.

Brilliant Dam is 42.6 metres high, with a net hydraulic head of 28 metres, and eight sluice gates. In 2000 work began to increase flow and upgrade the generating units. Upon completion, its four turbines will generate a combined 145 MW of electricity.

In 2003, the Columbia Power Corporation began the Brilliant expansion project. The project includes the construction of an additional powerhouse on the left bank, housing a 120 MW Kaplan turbine which uses excess water beyond the capacity of the original powerhouse. Completed in 2007, it increased the combined generation of the dam to 265 MW.

Brilliant Dam is downstream of Kootenay River's 49 MW Corra Linn Dam, 583 MW Kootenay Canal and 600 MW Libby Dam.

See also

List of dams in the Columbia River watershed
List of generating stations in BC
Doukhobors

References

External links 
 Hydroelectric Plants in - British Columbia
 History of the Brilliant Dam

Dams in British Columbia
Hydroelectric power stations in British Columbia
West Kootenay
Doukhobors
Dams completed in 1944
Dams on the Kootenay River
Gravity dams
Publicly owned dams in Canada